WUGM-LP (106.1 FM) is a radio station broadcasting a Rhythmic Oldies format, along with specialized Electronic dance music-based programming on the weekends. Licensed to Muskegon, Michigan, United States, the station is currently owned by West Michigan Community Help Network.

References

External links
 M106FM Facebook
 

UGM-LP
UGM-LP
Rhythmic oldies radio stations in the United States
Radio stations established in 2003
2003 establishments in Michigan